Le Théâtre du Soleil ("The Theater of the Sun") is a Parisian avant-garde stage ensemble founded by Ariane Mnouchkine, Philippe Léotard and fellow students of the L'École Internationale de Théâtre Jacques Lecoq in 1964 as a collective of theatre artists. Le Théâtre du Soleil is located at La Cartoucherie, a former munitions factory in the Vincennes area of eastern Paris. The company creates new theatrical works using a devising process based on utilizing physical theatre and improvisation.

Sociohistorical context
The Theatre du Soleil was founded as a theatre collective in 1964, in the midst of the cultural turmoil that was sweeping the Western world. In the midst of the Cold War, nuclear warfare felt imminent while the whole of Europe was slowly recovering from the destruction of World War II. In 1965, Charles de Gaulle was re-elected President of France in the first election with direct popular vote for the office. The year 1968 was a watershed for protests and turmoil around the world, and was characterized by rebellion against conventional culture, huge political demonstrations, and labor strikes in France involving 11 million workers, students, and far-left politicians. It was in the middle of this period of uncertainty, changing cultural attitudes, and disillusionment that Mnouchkine, a theatre student, started Le Theatre du Soleil with her peers who were interested in creating original theatre.

Timeline
1964: Le Theatre du Soleil is established

1964–65:
Les Petits Bourgeois presented at Théâtre Mouffetard

1965–66: 
Capitaine Fracasse presented at the Theater Récamier

1967: 
La Cuisine presented at Cirque de Montmartre

1968: 
Le Songe d'une Nuit d'Ete (A Midsummer's Night's Dream) 
L'Arbre Sorcier, Jerome et la Tortue

1969–70: 
Les Clowns presented at Festival d'Avignon, Piccolo Teatro de Milan

1970–1971: 
Le Theatre du Soleil moves to their permanent base, la Cartoucherie, a former munitions factory on the outskirts of Paris

1789 opens in La Cartoucherie.

1974:
Film version of 1789 released

1975:
L'Age d'Or

1976–77:
Don Juan

1978 Molière, film directed by Ariane Mnouchkine and starring Philippe Caubère, presents the biography of Moliere. It was in competition for the Palme d'Or at Cannes in 1978. 

1979–80:
Mephisto, Le Roman d'une Carriere

1981–84:
Translated works of Shakespeare are presented in cycles, including Richard II and Henry IV Parts 1 and 2

1985–86:
L'Histoire Terrible Mais Inachevee de Norodom Sihanouk, Roi du Cambodge

1987–88:
L'Indiade ou L'Inde de leurs Reves

1989:
Film version of La Nuit Miraculeuse

1990–93:
Cycle Les Atrides (including Ipighenie a Aulis, Agamemnon, Les Choephores, and Les Eumenides)

1993:
L'Inde, de Pere en Fils, de Mere en Fille

1994:
La Ville perjure ou le Reveil des Erinyes

1996–97:
Film Au Soleil Meme la Nuit

1997–98:
 Et Soudain des Nuits d'Eveil 
Tout est Bien qui Finit Bien

1999–2002:
La Ville Parjure ou le Reveil des Erinyes
Tambours sur la Digue

2003–2006:
Le Dernier Caravanserail (Odyssees) 
 Le Fleuve Cruel 
Origines et Destins

2007–2009:
Les Ephemeres

2008 :
Film L'Aventure du Theatre du Soleil

2010–2011: 
Les Naufrages du Fol Espoir (reached 200th performance in February 2011)

March 19–22 – Japanese kyogen troupe, hosted by Le Theatre du Soleil at La Cartoucherie, performs traditional kyogen pieces and an adaptation of Shakespeare's The Comedy of Errors

May 4 – Company tour begins in Nantes

2014-2015:
Macbeth

2016-2019:
Une Chambre en Inde (A Room in India, performed in New York City in December 2017, at the Park Avenue Armory
)

2018: Kanata (directed by Robert Lepage, with the troupe of Théâtre du Soleil)

Mission and philosophy
Founded by Ariane Mnouchkine, The Theatre du Soleil was founded in the 1960s as a reaction against traditional theatrical institutions in France. Although they have never presented a formalized mission statement, from their inception they have been characterized by a commitment to long-term collaborative rehearsal processes; the merging of a wide variety of art forms both Western and non-Western, including music, dance, and puppetry; actively communicating and mingling with their audiences; and maintaining a large, hierarchy-free company that does not live together but spends a lot of time working together, and equally shares the work of creating their productions. Company members describe working for the Theatre du Soleil as "a style of life", while a reviewer for The New York Times said of their production Les Ephemeres: "The aim here is not to shape life into taut dramatic form but to present lived experience intimately and without evidence of artists' interpretation and manipulation." Mnouchkine summarized the philosophy of the organization as "Theatre du Soleil is the dream of living, working, being happy and searching for beauty and for goodness….It's trying to live for higher purposes, not for richness. It's very simple, really."

The company's productions have included both re-imaginings of classics of Western theatre such as Shakespeare's Richard II and Moliere's Tartuffe, but the company is equally well known for their original works. The collective, consisting of 70 members as of July 2009, takes the concept and direction for their original productions from founder Ariane Mnouchkine, and works together in a collaborative rehearsal process that stretches out over many months to create a finished performance event. For example, their six-hour-long 2005 production Le Dernier Caravansérail (Odyssées) was based on a compilation of letters and interviews collected by Mnouchkine and her colleagues from refugee camps from around the world, while Les Ephemeres in 2009 was based on nine months of improvisations stemming from Mnouchkine's question: What would you do if you found out that all of humanity would die out within three months?

At other times, they provocatively, directly comment on contemporary events, such as their production of Tartuffe in which the title character was presented as an Islamic zealot at a time when there was a movement in France against foreign immigration. They have drawn inspiration from non-Western cultures, such as when they used bunraku-style puppetry in their production Tambours sur la Digue. The company's emphasis on movement and physical theatre is in part due to Mnouchkine's study under Jacques Lecoq. Their performances also frequently feature direct contact between the actors and the audience members, whether through a dressing and makeup area that is open to the public's view or lunch for both actors and audience served at intermission. 
Beyond their production process, part of the company's philosophy does not include communal living, although this is part of its legend,  and a very subtle if not complete lack of hierarchy for every member of the organization. All employees, whether actors, administrators, or technicians, are paid the exact same wage, and must sometimes go without a salary for months when the company is not performing and earning income. The company lives together in shared housing and equally shares the work of cooking, cleaning, and otherwise maintaining their living space. In addition, all performers do technical work on productions, such as maintaining moving set pieces for Les Ephemeres.

Major works
The Theatre du Soleil's premiere performance was in 1964–65 with Les Petits Bourgeois. The company's first widely recognized production was in 1967 with Arnold Wesker's 1957 play The Kitchen. They continued on to form a theatre collective and produce their first major success 1789, a show about the French Revolution. Their performance suggested "the Revolution was subverted by those more concerned about property than justice". Another of the company's most famous works was Les Atrides. This was made up of Euripides' Iphigenia at Aulis and Aeschylus' The Oresteia. The production took over two years to mount, played in numerous countries including the United States and Germany, and integrated several forms of Asian dance and drama. In 2005, Le Theatre du Soleil presented Le Dernier Caravanserail (Odyssees) or The Last Caravansary (Odysseys).

One of the company's most recent major works was their production of Les Ephemeres created and directed by Ariane Mnouchkine. The show premiered at the 2009 Lincoln Center Festival. Les Ephemeres is centered on the river of time with its events both past and present. The Village Voice characterized the show's theme as "To go with the flow, to accept the fact that time is the great devastator. Tout passe, tout casse, tout basse, says a French proverb: Everything passes, everything breaks, everything sinks." The performance is split in two three-and-a-half-hour-long sections with the full run time just over seven hours long.

Major players
While Ariane Mnouchkine, acknowledged as the founder of the troupe, regularly acts as the company's concept creator and director, a number of her fellow students were also her collaborators in the initial founding of the company, including: 
Georges Donzenac—physical training, physical education teacher
Myrrha Donzenac—actress
Gerard Hardy—actor
Philippe Leotard—actor
Roberto Moscoso—designer
Jean-Claude Penchenat—actor, director
Jean-Pierre Tailhade—actor
Francoise Tournafond—costume designer
Senior members such as Mnouchkine are not given preferential treatment. Mnouchkine, for example, refused to be interviewed alone for a New York Times article, although individuals such as Hélène Cixous (playwright) and Jean-Jacques Lemetre (composer and musician) repeatedly fulfill specific production roles and have done so for many years.

Europe Theatre Prize 
In 1987 the first artist to be awarded by the international jury of the Europe Theatre Prize chaired by Irene Papas was Ariane Mnouchkine for her work with the Théâtre du Soleil.

Reason for Award:The Jury, unanimously decided to award the 1987 Europe Theatre Prize to the Théâtre du Soleil directed by Ariane Mnouchkine, for having directed and realized on solid foundations an effective contribution to the renewal of theatre language and to the proposal for a new approach to the profession of the actor.

The Prize consists in a sum of 60,000 ECU and in an original sculpture of Pietro Consagra.

See also
Ariane Mnouchkine
Philippe Leotard
Jacques Lecoq
Hélène Cixous
Physical theatre
Moliere
Bunraku

References

External links
 
 
 
 
 
 
 Video "Nymphe de la République", Paris, october 2010, Le théâtre du soleil taking part to demonstration of french trade unions.

Theatre companies in France
Performing groups established in 1964